Sperm precedence, also known as sperm predominance, is tendency of a female who has been bred by multiple males to give birth to their offspring in unequal proportions. Sperm precedence is an important factor in the sperm competition.

Sperm precedence can be temporal, favoring either the first or last male to breed the female. (The former is known as first sperm precedence and the latter is known as last sperm precedence); or it can favor the male whose sperm are the most motile; or the male whose sperm were delivered closest to the female's ova. First male sperm precedence is seen in a variety of species, including the common crab spider, Misumena vatia.

References

Reproduction in mammals